Yixuan may refer to:

People
 Yixuan, Prince Chun (1840–1891), a Manchu prince and statesman of the late Qing Dynasty
 An Yixuan (born 1980), Taiwanese actress
 Duan Yixuan (born 1995), Chinese singer and actress
 Hu Yixuan (born 1994), Chinese swimmer
 Li Yixuan (born 1997), Chinese tennis player
 Linji Yixuan (died 866), Chinese Buddhist teacher
 Zhou Yixuan (born 1990), Chinese rapper, singer, and actor

Automobiles
 Aeolus Yixuan, a 2019–present Chinese compact sedan
 Aeolus Yixuan GS, a 2020–present Chinese compact crossover
 Aeolus Yixuan Max, a 2021–present Chinese mid-size sedan